Little Hope is an unincorporated community in Erie County, Pennsylvania, United States.

History
The origin of the name "Little Hope" is obscure. A variant name was "Greenfield". A post office called Greenfield was established in 1822, and remained in operation until 1905.

References

Unincorporated communities in Erie County, Pennsylvania
Unincorporated communities in Pennsylvania